Korchvandan (also Romanized as Korchvandān; also known as Korchehvandān) is a village in Howmeh Rural District, in the Central District of Rasht County, Gilan Province, Iran. At the 2006 census, its population was 112, in 31 families.

References 

Populated places in Rasht County